Shuangcheng (Chinese: 雙城站; Pinyin: Shuāngchéng zhàn) is a light rail station of the Ankeng light rail, operated by the New Taipei Metro, in Xindian, New Taipei, Taiwan.

Station overview 
The station is an at-grade station with 2 side platforms. It is located on Section 3, Anyi Road.

Station layout

Around the station 
 Ankeng Depot

History 
Construction of the station started in 2014 and finished in 2022. The station opened on February 10, 2023.

See also 

 Ankeng light rail
 New Taipei Metro
 Rail transport in Taiwan

References

External links 
New Taipei Metro Corporation

New Taipei City Department of Rapid Transit
Ankeng light rail stations